Trefdraeth is a hamlet in Anglesey, Wales, within the community of Bodorgan about  southwest of the county town of Llangefni.

Trefdraeth's Church in Wales parish church of St Beuno dates from the 13th century.

Glantraeth Football Club play their home games in Trefdraeth. They are the only club on Anglesey to have won a Cymru Alliance league and cup double, the second tier of Welsh football.

Notable people 
 William Williams (1739–1817), a Welsh antiquarian and poet.
 John Owen Jones (1861–1899), (known as ) a campaigning journalist, was born at Ty'n y Morfa, Trefdraeth.
 Naomi Watts (born 1981), who lived locally as a child, is president of Glantraeth F.C.

References

Villages in Anglesey
Bodorgan